Modern College, is a college in Kohima, Nagaland, India. The college was established in 1997. It offers undergraduate courses in Arts and is affiliated to the Nagaland University.

Departments

Arts
English
History
Political Science
Sociology
Economics
Education
Vocation

Accreditation
The college is recognized by the University Grants Commission (UGC).

References

External links
Modern College Official Website

Colleges affiliated to Nagaland University
Universities and colleges in Nagaland
Educational institutions established in 1997
1997 establishments in Nagaland